Salacca ramosiana is a species of palm in the genus Salacca. It is native to the Philippines and to the Island of Borneo. It has a palm with pinnate fronds and long sharp spines along the margins of the petioles.

References

ramosiana
Flora of Borneo
Flora of the Philippines
Plants described in 1986